Design is the creation of a plan or specification for the construction of an object or a system.

Design may also refer to:

Science and mathematics
 Block design
 Combinatorial design
 Design of experiments
 Engineering design process
 Randomized block design, in statistics

Entertainment
 Design (band), a 1970s British vocal group
 The Design, a 2005 album by Into the Moat
 Design, a record label founded by Marco Carola

Other uses
 Communication design
 Fashion design
 Game design
 Graphic design
 Interior design
 Scenic design

See also 
 Design methods
 Designer
 Interior Design (disambiguation)